The 2005–06 Romanian first division was a very tight season. Steaua, Rapid and Dinamo were very close in the table, and teams like CFR Cluj and FCU Politehnica Timişoara were competitive in their bids for a position to qualify for the European Cups.

The Romania national team did not go to the 2006 FIFA World Cup.

Divizia A

European Cups

UEFA Champions League

Steaua București
This section will cover Steaua's games from July 27, 2005 until the start of August 23, 2005.

UEFA Cup

Steaua București
This section will cover Steaua's games from September 23, 2005 until today.

Rapid București
This section will cover Rapid's games from July 14, 2005 until today.

Dinamo București
This section will cover Dinamo's games from August 11, 2005 until December 14, 2005.

UEFA Intertoto Cup

CFR Ecomax Cluj
This section will cover CFR Cluj's games from June 18, 2005 until August 23, 2005.

Gloria Bistriţa
This section will cover Gloria's games from June 18, 2005 until July 10, 2005.

Romania national team
This section will cover Romania's games from July 1, 2005 until the start of 2008 European Championship (qualifying).

 
Seasons in Romanian football
Romania